Verbivka, is a village located in Chortkiv Raion of Ternopil Oblast in western Ukraine. It belongs to Skala-Podilska settlement hromada, one of the hromadas of Ukraine.

Until 18 July 2020, Verbivka belonged to Borshchiv Raion. The raion was abolished in July 2020 as part of the administrative reform of Ukraine, which reduced the number of raions of Ternopil Oblast to three. The area of Borshchiv Raion was merged into Chortkiv Raion.

References

Notes

Sources

External links
  

Villages in Chortkiv Raion